The 1895–96 season was Burslem Port Vale's fourth consecutive season of football in the English Football League. Another poor season struggling at the wrong end of the table, this time they failed to gain re-election; two seasons in the Midlands League followed, and despite a finish of 7th and then 5th they were re-elected back into the Football League for the expanded 1898–99 season.

A season to forget, a 5–4 victory over eventual champions Liverpool was one of the few memorable days. This came during a run of games which saw 65 goals in 11 games. Overall a leaky defence kept just 5 clean sheets in 30 league and 4 cup games. On their travels the team lost all their games save for a 2–0 win over Rotherham Town on the opening day. From 21 September 1895 to 18 April 1896 they recorded 14 straight losses away from home, and went 27 games without a draw away from home between 26 January 1895 and 3 December 1898 – both club records.

Overview

Second Division
Vale finished in 14th place, with 18 points, 28 points short of champions Liverpool. They finished four points behind Lincoln City, who were safe from re-election. Having twice successfully applied for re-election in the past three seasons, this time round they lost their league status. Nearby Crewe Alexandra fared even worse than Vale, and didn't return to the Football League until 1921, whilst Rotherham Town were never to return. However Vale spent just two seasons in the Midland League before winning back their league status.

The club suffered heavy defeats at Anfield, at Darwen, at Leicester Fosse, and in both clashes with Notts County and Grimsby Town. However they did manage victories over future giants of the game Liverpool, Newton Heath (later Manchester United), and Newcastle United.

Top scorers of previous years were lost, Billy Beats sold to Wolverhampton Wanderers in pre-season, whilst Meshach Dean lost his touch. Goals at a premium, Ernest Beckett (8), and Jim Mason (6) were the only players to score with anything approaching regularity. Highly impressive goalkeeper Tom Baddeley was an ever-present for the second successive season, with left-back George Youds and centre-half Ralph Barlow missing just one match each. At the end of the season Baddeley and Eccles left for Wolves, Eardley and McDonald left for Stoke; all wishing to remain Football League players.

Cup competitions
Again Vale failed poorly in the FA Cup, easing past Scottish club Hereford Thistle in the first round of qualification with a walkover. The Second Round held league rivals Burton Swifts, who managed to draw at Vale's home and then win the replay with the odd goal. Facing rivals Stoke in the Staffordshire Senior Cup, they lost 4–0 at home.

League table

Results

Football League Second Division

Burslem Port Vale's score comes first

Results by matchday

Matches

FA Cup

Birmingham Senior Cup

Staffordshire Senior Cup

Player statistics

Appearances

Top scorers

Transfers

Transfers in

Transfers out

References
Specific

General

Port Vale F.C. seasons
Burslem Port Vale